The president of the Republic of Uzbekistan is the head of state and executive authority in Uzbekistan. The office of President was established in 1991, replacing the position of Chairperson of the Presidium of the Supreme Soviet of the Uzbek SSR, which had existed since 1925. The president is directly elected for a term of five years, by citizens of Uzbekistan who have reached 18 years of age.

Islam Karimov was the only President of Uzbekistan for 25 years following the establishment of the office; he won three consecutive elections which many consider to have been rigged. The third election was the most controversial since he had been elected twice and the current Constitution stipulated a maximum of two terms. The official explanation was that his first term in office, of five years, was under the previous Constitution and did not count towards the new limit. He died in office on 2 September 2016. A joint session of both houses of the Supreme Assembly of Uzbekistan appointed Prime Minister Shavkat Mirziyoyev as interim President on 8 September 2016. In December 2016, Mirziyoyev was elected President in a popular vote, though international observers described the election as not free and fair, due to restrictions on media reporting and ballot stuffing.

Election

Qualifications
The Constitution of Uzbekistan requires that a presidential candidate be at least 35 years old, be fluent in speaking the state language (Uzbek), and have resided for at least ten years in the territory of Uzbekistan.

On taking office, the president must take the following oath, stipulated by Article 92 of the constitution, at a sitting of the Supreme Assembly of Uzbekistan:

The president places his hand on the Constitution of Uzbekistan as well as the Quran when they take the oath of office.

Electoral law
The constitution states that the officeholder shall be elected by citizens of the Republic of Uzbekistan on the basis of universal, equal and direct suffrage by secret ballot.

Role
The Constitution of Uzbekistan lays out the duties and powers of the President of the Republic, which in detail are: 
 To guarantee observance of rights and freedoms of citizens, the Constitution and laws of the Republic of Uzbekistan;
 To take the necessary measures for the protection of the sovereignty, security and territorial integrity of the Republic of Uzbekistan, and implementation of decisions regarding its national-state structure;
 To represent the Republic of Uzbekistan within the country and in international relations;
 To conduct negotiations and sign treaties and agreements for the Republic, and ensure the observance of the treaties and agreements negotiated by the Republic and obligations assumed by it;
 To receive letters of credence and recall from diplomatic and other representatives accredited to him/her;
 To present to the Senate of the Oliy Majlis (parliament) nominees for appointment as diplomatic and other representatives of the Republic of Uzbekistan to foreign states;
 To present to the Oliy Majlis of Uzbekistan annual reports on major matters of social and economic life, home and foreign policies of the country;
 To form the office of executive authority and direct it; ensure interaction of the supreme bodies of authority and administration of the Republic; form and abolish ministries, state committees and other bodies of state administration with subsequent submission of decrees on these matters for approval by the chambers of the Oliy Majlis;
 To present to the Senate a nominee for election to the post of Chairperson of the Senate;
 To present for consideration and approval by the chambers of the Oliy Majlis a nominee for the office of Prime Minister, and relieve the Prime Minister of that post;
 To approve, on the nomination of the Prime Minister, members of the Cabinet of Ministers, and relieve them of their posts;
 To appoint a Procurator-General and deputies, subject to approval by the Senate, and relieve them of their posts;
 To present to the Senate nominees for the posts of Chairperson and judges of the Constitutional Court, Chairperson and judges of the Supreme Court, Chairperson and judges of the Higher Economic Court, Chairperson of the Board of the Central Bank, and Chairperson of the State Committee for the Protection of Nature;
 To appoint judges of regional, inter-district, district, city, martial and economic courts, and relieve them of their posts;
 To appoint and relieve khokims of regions and the city of Tashkent of their posts with their subsequent approval by relevant Kenghashes of people’s deputies. The President shall have the right to relieve, by his decision, khokims of districts and cities of their posts, should they violate the Constitution or laws, or perform acts discrediting the honour and dignity of a khokim;
 To suspend and repeal acts passed by bodies of state administration, as well as khokims;
 To sign and promulgate laws; the President shall have the right to return a law, stating his objections, to the Oliy Majlis for a second debate and vote;
 To announce a state of war in the event of an attack on the Republic of Uzbekistan, or arising from treaty obligations on mutual defence from aggression; and within 72 hours to submit such decision for approval by the chambers of the Oliy Majlis;
 In exceptional cases (real external threat, mass disturbances, major catastrophes, natural calamities, epidemics), in the interests of ensuring citizens’ security, to proclaim a state of emergency in the entire territory or in particular localities, and within 72 hours to submit such decision for approval by the chambers of the Oliy Majlis. Conditions and the procedure for introducing a state of emergency shall be regulated by law;
 To serve as the Supreme Commander-in-Chief of the Armed Forces, appoint and relieve the supreme command of the Armed Forces, and confer the highest military ranks;
 To award orders, medals and certificates of honour and confer qualification and honorary titles of the Republic of Uzbekistan;
 To rule on matters of citizenship and the grant of political asylum;
 To propose to the Senate any acts of amnesty and effective pardoning of persons sentenced by the courts;
 To form the National Security Service and nominate and relieve the Chairperson of the National Security Service of his post, subject to approval of decrees on these matters by the Senate;
 To exercise other powers stipulated by the Constitution and laws of the Republic.

Presidential Administration
The Office of the President of the Republic of Uzbekistan is the informational, advisory and organizational body of the presidency, which directly reports to the President of the Republic. The presidential administration is guided by the Constitution and laws of Uzbekistan, as well as decrees, by implementing resolutions and orders of the officeholder.

Structure 
Head of the Presidential Administration of the Republic of Uzbekistan
First Deputy Head of the Presidential Administration
Deputy Head of the Presidential Administration
Presidential Spokesperson
Presidential Advisor 
Presidential Advisor on Public Service and Cadastre
Presidential Advisor on Legal Support and Coordination of Law Enforcement Affairs
Deputy Presidential Adviser on Reforms Legal Support and Coordination of Law Enforcement Affairs
President's Advisor on Citizens' Rights Protection, Claims Control and Coordination
Presidential Adviser on Youth, Science, Education, Health and Sports
Rector of the Academy of Public Administration under the President of Uzbekistan
Head of the Department of Finance
President's Advisor on Economic Sector Development, Investment and Foreign Trade Policy
President's Advisor on the development of the economy, investment and foreign trade policy

National Security Council

Residence

The official residence and workplace of the president of Uzbekistan is the Kuksaroy Presidential Palace in Tashkent, serving as the president's official residence since 2016. Prior to this, the Ok Saroy Presidential Palace was the official residence of President Islam Karimov. A residence that is also used is called Durmen, based in Tashkent's Qibray District. Since he came to power in December 2016, President Shavkat Mirziyoyev has used the district to a new residence for himself, which would include a presidential highway and a presidential compound with an interior that contains Argentinian blue marble slabs and Swarovski crystals.

Presidential Security and Transport

The Uzbek government operates a Boeing 767-300 and an Airbus A320-200 for use during state visits to other countries and travel by air to other parts of the country. These jets, which are provided by Uzbekistan Airways, have Uzbekistan's flag on the vertical stabilizers instead of the company's logo, symbolizing the status of the jet as a presidential plane. When it comes to transport by land, the president always employs as special Mercedes-Benz S-Class car which is used to transport the president throughout the city of Tashkent as well as take him/her to their residence at the end of the work day. The National Guard of Uzbekistan and the State Security Service are primarily responsible for the president's security when he/she is travelling. Kuksaroy is always protected by members of the armed forces and the SNB at all times.

List of presidents of Uzbekistan

Latest election

See also
List of leaders of Uzbekistan
Vice President of Uzbekistan
Prime Minister of Uzbekistan
Politics of Uzbekistan

External links 

 Official Website
 Former Website

References

Politics of Uzbekistan
Government of Uzbekistan
 
Uzbekistan
1990 establishments in Uzbekistan
President